Heggelund is a surname. Notable people with the surname include:

Kjell Heggelund (1932–2017), Norwegian literary researcher, lecturer, editor, manager, poet, translator and literary critic
Stefan Heggelund (born 1984), Norwegian communication consultant and politician
Tørris Heggelund (1872–1940), Norwegian jurist and politician